Richard Boadu (born 4 April 1998) is a Ghanaian professional footballer who plays as midfielder for Ghana Premier League side Medeama S.C.

Early life 
Boadu was born and bred in Kumasi.

Career

Early career 
Boadu started his career with Cornerstones FC. a lower-tier side based in Kumasi. Boadu played for lower-tier side Phar Rangers before securing a deal to Medeama in 2018. Prior to that move, he was linked with a move to then Wa All Stars in 2016.

Medeama SC 
In February 2018, Boadu signed for  Tarkwa-based side Medeama SC on a long-term deal. On 28 February 2018, he was unveiled along with 10 other players including Ebenezer Ackahbi, Bright Enchil and Ali Ouattara as the new signings for the club ahead of the 2018 Ghana Premier League. He made his debut on 17 March 2018, playing 90 minute in a 1–0 victory over Karela United. He made 5 league appearances that season, before the league was suspended due to the dissolution of the Ghana Football Association (GFA) in June 2018, as a result of the Anas Number 12 Expose.

During the 2019–20 Ghana Premier League season, he played in 14 league matches before the league was cancelled as a result of the COVID-19 pandemic. In March 2020, he signed a new 4-year contract with the club, which will keep him at the club until 2024, with an option to extend for a further year. In July 2020, he revealed his interest in wanting to play for Ghanaian giants Kumasi Asante Kotoko. Asante Kotoko later wrote to Medeama in September 2020, to enquire about his availability and started negotiations in trying to sign him. The deal however did not take place and he was named on the Medeama SC squad list for the 2020–21 Ghana Premier League season.

References

External links 

 

Living people
1998 births
Association football midfielders
Ghana Premier League players
Medeama SC players
Cornerstones F.C. players
Ghanaian footballers